Alexander Petrovich Barkashov (sometimes transliterated as Aleksandr; born 6 October 1953) is a Russian political leader and far-right nationalist who in 1990 founded Russian National Unity, a fascist paramilitary organization.

Biography

Born in Moscow, Barkashov's father was an electrician and his mother was a nurse. Barkashov left school in 1971 and entered the military where he served in Belarus.  After his discharge, he returned to Moscow and found employment in an underground thermal energy station as an electrician-fitter. While uninterested in his work, he was passionate about reading books about great conquerors of history (especially Alexander the Great and Genghis Khan), learning karate (even setting up his own club), and making weapons (bows and daggers) with his own hands.

Barkashov joined the far-right nationalist movement Pamyat in 1985 and rose quickly within its ranks. He was elected to the Central Council within a year, and by 1989 was second only to Dmitri Vasilyev. Conflict between Barkashov and Vasilyev resulted in Barkashov leading, in his words, "the most disciplined and active members, dissatisfied with empty talk and theatrical stunts, out of Pamyat". While considering other organizations to join, Barkashov and friends decided to create their own. 

On 16 October 1990, Barkashov and a few dozen followers gathered at his home on Moscow's Dubinin Street and founded "the National Unity for a Free Strong Just Russia" (soon shortened to "the Russian National Unity", and informally among the Barkashovtsy [Barkashovites]: "the Unity" [Yedinstvo]). Historian Walter Laqueur writes that Barkashov stated in an interview that he is a Nazi.

During the Russian constitutional crisis of 1993, Barkashov led RNU fighters in their defense of the Russian White House against Boris Yeltsin's forces. Escaping arrest by fleeing Moscow, Barkashov took refuge in a nearby dacha. Shot in the thigh during an evening stroll, Barkashov was brought to a hospital where a nurse recognized him. Barkashov was imprisoned on charges of organizing and inciting mass disorder and illegally bearing arms. In early 1994, the newly elected Duma granted amnesty to Barkashov.

In 1994, Barkashov published his book, Azbuka russkogo natsionalista (ABC of a Russian Nationalist), which became the primary source of the RNU's platform.

At the end of February 1999, one opinion poll ranked Barkashov as one of Russia's 10 most recognizable politicians. Barkashov remains the leader of the RNU (which, after numerous splits is often defined as the "RNU of A.P. Barkashov").

On 2 December 2005 Barkashov together with three of his followers was detained and arrested for "attacking a police-officer". According to the press-release of the RNU, Barkashov himself was attacked and injured by the police officer who penetrated into Barkashov's residence.

On 6 November 2009 Barkashov formed the movement ″Union of the Defenders of Russia - October 1993″ together with Vladislav Achalov and Stanislav Terekhov, the leader of the Union of Officers.

During the Russo-Ukrainian War, Barkashov actively supports the Russian-backed separatists. In a leaked audio recording from spring 2014, Barkashov consulted Dmitri Boitsov, the leader of the Russian Orthodox Army. According to Barkahsov's words, his own son fought with a column of pro-Russian fighters against Ukraine.

Footnotes

References
Russian Fascism: Traditions, Tendencies, Movements by Stephen D. Shenfield (M. E. Sharpe, 2001,  and ).
The Beast Reawakens by Martin A. Lee (1997, Little, Brown and Company), chapter eight: "Shadow Over the East"

External links 
Alexander Barkashov's web site (russian)
Key leader profile: Aleksandr P. Barkashov, at the MIPT Terrorism Knowledge Base (includes three photos).
Aleksandr Petrovich Barkashov at the NUPI Centre for Russian Studies' Database.
Russian Fascism and Russian Fascists by Kirill Buketov.
 by John B. Dunlop (click here for PDF).
Antisemitism in Russia, 1995-97 by the Union of Councils for Jews in the Former Soviet Union.
What is Happening inside Russia? by Dr. Tankred Golenpolsky, in The Jewish Magazine.

1953 births
Living people
Politicians from Moscow
Russian anti-communists
Russian nationalists
Russian neo-Nazis
Neo-Nazi politicians
Soviet military personnel
Russian shooting survivors
Defenders of the White House (1993)
Pro-Russian people of the war in Donbas
Russian conspiracy theorists